1987 in Korea may refer to:
1987 in North Korea
1987 in South Korea